Fort Morgan station is an Amtrak intercity train station in Fort Morgan, Colorado. The depot was originally built by the Chicago, Burlington and Quincy Railroad in 1922.

References

External links

Fort Morgan Amtrak Station (USA Rail Guide -- TrainWeb)

Amtrak stations in Colorado
Transportation buildings and structures in Morgan County, Colorado
Former Chicago, Burlington and Quincy Railroad stations